This is a list of FM radio stations in the United States having call signs beginning with the letters KT through KV. Low-power FM radio stations, those with designations such as KTAH-LP, have not been included in this list.

KT--

KU--

KV--

See also
 North American call sign

FM radio stations in the United States by call sign (initial letters KT-KV)